Saldi  is a village in the Mehsana District, Gujarat, India, Pin Code 382730,  situated on State Highway 217 between Gandhinagar and Mehsana. Saldi represents a typical countryside village of India.  It borders the following villages: langhnaj, Veda, Parsa, Charadu, Vadasma, Shankarpura, Khata Amba, Khoraj and Himatpura. Saldi is famous for its temple of Pimpleshwar Mahadev, about 1 kilometre from the Saldi town square.

The nearest railway stations are Kalol which is located 25 km and Mehsana 26 km from Saldi. Sardar Patel International Airport  - Ahmedabad  is about 50 km  from Saldi.

Geography
Location of Saldi, Pin 382730 Dist Mehsana  Gujarat India on MAP is  Coordinates: 23°25'50"N   72°31'43"E

Demography
Saldi is home of many Hindu, Jain and Islam followers.   The total population of is approximately 4000 where Hindus constitute the main population. Patel and Thakore castes constitute major of the total population. Goswami, Brahmin, Jain, Shah, Desai, Panchal, Nayi, Suthar, Raval, Momin, Pathan, Solanki and Prjapati follow them. Ravals work on local transport, lemon tree and on sundries. Peoples from 
all cast and religion are united for village and live together, work together, celebrate together and help each other in everyday life

History
                                            
Salvabhai  Patel was the son of Teja Patel and he migrated from Champaner, before The young Sultan of Gujarat, Mahmud Begada, deciding to attack Champaner with his army in December 1482. He raised  his family in this  area which ultimately came to be known as Saldi.
 
Approximately 200 years or seven generations following the founding of Saldi village, one of the cows of a herder named Petha Patel was found to be regularly offering her milk over one location under a Pimpal tree  where the  JALADHARI was ultimately found.
 
In the Hindu tradition, worshipers of Shiva pay homage to the Shivling by pouring milk over a Shivling. Thus, the cow's offering of her milk at this site without any assistance, led to the people of Saldi to attribute this phenomenon to the presence of swayambhu Lord Shiva. Since then, the current site of Pimpleshwar Mahadev is considered to be very sacred by the pilgrims and villagers alike, and it has become famous throughout the state of Gujarat over the years.

The first temple or shrine was put in place by Petha Patel of Saldi at this site dating back Hindu Year  Sanvat 1143 ( approximately 924 years ago).

In the following centuries, Pimpleshwar Mahadev gained more popularity as a place of pilgrimage and worship for Hindus across the state of Gujarat. The current building was constructed and renovated by Sayajirao Gaekwad, the ruler of the state Baroda in 1895( approximately 116 years ago ) during the British colonial era in India.

Education
Shree V K Patel Sarvajanik High School (also known as Saldi High School) is a secondary school offer grade 8-10.
Smt Chanchalben Vitthaldas M. Patel Primary School is for younger Kids.  Students from all surrounding villages come to study at Saldi High School. Saldi  offer also has kindergarten and Pre school program at Bal Mandir and AnganVadi.
 
People of Saldi take  proud of academic excellence by virtue of their education, discipline  and hard work with number of Engineers, Physician, and Businessmen working in India, United States of America, Australia, England and Canada.

Facilities
The village has a well to provide agricultural irrigation and also an overhead water tank for human consumption. Among other facilities are a library, an animal clinic and a post office.

Shiv Dhara Dairy is located in central part of village near Town Hall. Saldi has many of mehsani buffalos. These buffalos are known for good quality and higher production of buffalo milk. Milk is collected on daily basis at Shiv Dhara Dairy ( local dairy )  and transported to Dudhsagar Dairy facility through special network of Gujarat Cooperative Milk Marketing Federation Ltd.

Shooting of  "Maa Umiya Annapurna" (a Gujarati Devotional film directed by Mr. Vallabh Choksi)  was held in  Saldi in 1978.

Migration
A large portion of the population of Saldi has migrated to larger cities in Gujarat, India, and abroad. At least half of all households in Saldi have family members living in the United States or Canada.

Temples

Pimpleshwar Mahadev Pimpleshwar Mahadev is main attraction and holy site for its devotees.
Jayashree Mata Temple
Mahakali Temple
Ramji Mandir
Baliya Dev,  New Temple open to Public in 2011
Joganiya Mata Shrine
Shri Sumtinath Jain Derasar
Sat Kaival Temple
Hanuman Temple
Ramdevpir Temple,  New Temple open to Public in 2011
Brahmani Mata Temple
Shree Sumatinath Jain Derasar

References

Villages in Mehsana district